The following highways are numbered 604:

Canada
 Alberta Highway 604
 Ontario Highway 604 (former)
Saskatchewan Highway 604

Costa Rica
 National Route 604

United States